Bulgariopsis is a genus of fungi in the family Helotiaceae. The genus contains 1 or 2 species.

References

Helotiaceae